Associazione Calcio Pavia 1911 Società Sportiva Dilettantistica, or more simply Pavia, is an Italian football club, based in Pavia, Lombardy. Pavia plays in Eccellenza, informally called Serie E.

History 
The club was founded in 1911. Benny Carbone played for the club from 2008 to 2010, before becoming the coach at the end of the 2010–11 season, saving the team from relegation.

Colors and badge 
The team's colors are blue and white-black.

Honours
 Serie C
 Winners: 1928–29, 1932–33, 1952–53
 Serie C2
 Winners: 1983–84, 2002–03

References

External links
Official website 
Unofficial site

 
Football clubs in Italy
Football clubs in Lombardy
Phoenix clubs (association football)
Association football clubs established in 1911
Serie B clubs
Serie C clubs
Serie D clubs
1911 establishments in Italy
1942 establishments in Italy